Alfred Cooper (1838–1908) was an English surgeon and clubman.

Alfred or Alf Cooper may also refer to:
 Alfred Cooper (priest) (died 1920), archdeacon of Calgary
 Alfred Heaton Cooper (1864–1929), Victorian artist
 Alfred Edward Cooper (1869–1960), South African cricketer
 Alfred Egerton Cooper (1883–1974), British painter
 Alfred Cooper (cricketer) (1893–1963), South African Test cricketer
 Alfred Cooper (baseball) (1899–1966), American Negro leagues baseball player
 Alf Cooper (born 1932), Irish cricketer and doctor, later emigrated to the United States
 Alf Cooper (footballer), English footballer; see list of Sheffield Wednesday F.C. players